Mungalalu Truscott Airbase or Truscott-Mungalalu Airport , which during World War II was known as Truscott Airfield (or usually just simply referred to as Truscott) is today a commercial airport in the remote Kimberley region of Western Australia.

Located on the Anjo Peninsula in the far north Kimberley district of Western Australia. Mungalalu Truscott occupies  on Aboriginal land.

The airbase falls under the traditional custodianship of the Wunambal Gaambera people, who use the traditional name for the area: Mungalalu. The base is managed by Mungalalu Truscott Airbase Pty Ltd (MT Airbase) and has been registered with the Civil Aviation Safety Authority as a commercial air base since April 2005. MT Airbase manages the Mungalalu Truscott Base under an agreement with the Wunambal Gaambera Aboriginal Corporation (WGAC). Agreement has been reached with WGAC to sub lease the airfield and base area with licences for access to certain roads and areas of coastline until 2042.

Current operations 
Today the airbase has multiple roles, but primarily that of a staging base for workers on the offshore oil and gas fields in the Timor Sea. In addition it serves as an Aeromedical Retrieval and Search & Rescue (S.A.R.) base from which helicopter operations can be conducted with Critical Care Flight Paramedics on board. Operations include oil & gas companies, RFDS calls and AusSAR activations. Workers are flown into the base by fixed wing aircraft and then transferred to helicopters at Mungalalu Truscott for the final flight leg to offshore facilities in and around the Timor Sea. Currently, three Sikorsky S92 helicopters operated by Babcock Helicopters are based at Mungalalu Truscott. In the recent past there have been up to seven helicopters of varying types operated out of the base by Babcock, Bristow Helicopters and CHC. Other regular users of the base include the Australian Customs and Border Protection Service who use the airbase as a staging post for their aerial surveillance patrols in the area. In April 2020 PHI International began operations from Mungalalu Truscott Airbase using S92 aircraft to support the Ichthys gas field operated by Inpex.

Mungalalu Truscott is the largest all-weather airbase in the far north Kimberley region. The sealed runway with PAPI lights for night operations is the premier option for companies with business interests in the region. Mungalalu Truscott complies with CASA MoS 139 regulation and allows unrestricted operations for aircraft up to 29 seat capacity. There are two hangars currently (2014) certified by CASA as maintenance hangars, two additional covered storage hangars and a well equipped medical facility. There is camp accommodation with individual rooms for 71 pax and facilities include a shared mess, swimming pool and gymnasium. In past years, numerous aircraft types have utilised the aerodrome; they have included Fairchild Metro 23, Embraer EMB 120 Brasilia and Bombardier Dash 8.

History

World War II 

The airfield was originally constructed in 1944 by the RAAF Airfield Construction Unit, under Commanding Officer S/Ldr Trevor Nossiter, as a Royal Australian Air Force (RAAF) base and was actively used during World War II. RAAF Truscott was named after the Australian air ace, Keith "Bluey" Truscott, who had been killed in a training accident in 1943.

The site was chosen because it is the point on the Australian mainland closest to Java, where Japanese forces were concentrated. Aircraft from nearby RAAF fighter squadrons (and occasionally RAF units) were rotated through the base to provide air defence for the base.

Construction and the subsequent operations from the base were conducted under total secrecy and the existence of the base was never formally acknowledged until after the war.

The host unit at the base was RAAF 58 Operating Base Unit (58OBU). Australian Army anti-aircraft and searchlight batteries were also based at Truscott scattered around the peninsula. A civilian work unit from the Allied Works Council was based at Truscott for the maintenance of roads around the base and a RAAF Marine Section was stationed in West Bay to support the Catalina Flying Boat operations, operate search and rescue water craft and support the maritime resupply of the air base.

RAAF, Royal Netherlands East Indies Army Air Force (ML-KNIL) and United States Army Air Forces (USAAF) heavy and medium bombers would stage through Truscott, often rearming and refuelling several times on bombing missions into Japanese held areas before returning to their home bases around Western Australia and the Northern Territory.

B-24 Liberator heavy bombers and B-25 Mitchell medium bombers were two of the most common airframes to stage through Truscott. Catalina flying boats operated from West Bay and Spitfire aircraft were the most common fighter rotated through the base for local air defence.

On 18 January 1944, two RAAF personnel, Sergeants Castle and Martin, part of a unit making preparations for construction of the airfield heard a vessel which they suspected was a Japanese submarine or boat. To prevent Japanese forces learning of Truscott's location, they did not investigate. They reported their story to North-Western Area Headquarters who thought that it may have been a Japanese submarine running on the surface to charge its batteries. It was later confirmed that they had heard a Japanese reconnaissance vessel named Hiyoshi Maru, a converted 25 ton fishing boat. Research done after the war has confirmed that Lieutenant Susuhiko Mizuno led a special Japanese Army reconnaissance party from Kupang, in Timor on board the Hiyoshi Maru. The party landed on Browse Island and stayed for about 3 hours. On the next morning they entered an inlet on the Western Australian coast. Three landing parties led by Lieutenant Susuhiko Mizuno, Sergeant Morita and Sergeant Furuhashi, went ashore and explored different areas. They even took some 8 mm movie footage of what they saw. As it turned out they had landed only  from where the RAAF were several weeks later to start building the secret airfield.

On 20 July 1944 a Japanese Mitsubishi Ki-46-II "Dinah" Aircraft, piloted by Lt. Kiyoshi Izuka with his observer Lt. Hisao Itoh was shot down over the Anjo Peninsula by a flight of No. 54 Squadron RAF Spitfires killing both crew. As of September 2007 the remains of the Japanese aircraft was still on the peninsula near the current operating air base.
At the end of the war the base was closed down, with it playing a small role as a transit camp for the repatriation of Dutch citizens from the former Netherlands East Indies in 1946.

Crashes during World War II 

Several significant air accidents occurred during the operation of the base in World War II.

On 16 November 1944, two Spitfires from No. 549 Squadron RAF collided while changing formation in preparation for landing at the base. Warrant Officer Bushell, pilot of Spitfire A58-364, managed to parachute to safety; but W/O Posse, pilot of A58-300 died in the crash. Remnants of both aircraft still exist near the present airstrip.

On 23 March 1945, Liberator A72-80, under the command of Squadron Leader N. H. Straus, crashed shortly after takeoff. He was unable to see the runway, and the aircraft crashed into the sea several kilometres short of Truscott, killing all on board (11 crew, and one passenger). The wreck site was located in 2009.

On 20 May 1945, Liberator A72-160 (a B-24M-10-CO model), on a mission to Balikpapan and piloted by Flight Lieutenant F. L. Sismey, crashed soon after takeoff, near the north west end of the runway. The aircraft was destroyed by its depth charges exploding. All 11 crew members were killed.

One of the most well known aircraft wrecks at Truscott actually pre-dates the base by two years. On the western side of the air base, in Vansittart Bay, there lies the wreckage of a USAAF Air Transport Command C-53 Skytrooper transport (a variant of the Douglas DC-3; serial number 41-20066). This aircraft made an emergency landing on 26 February 1942, after the pilot got lost while flying from Perth to Broome, and put it down on a salt pan on Anjo Peninsula. The crew and passengers were rescued by a commercial flying boat several days later.

Heritage value 

Mungalalu Truscott Base has been classified and entered into the Council of the National Trust of Western Australia list of Heritage Places due to its significance during World War II and the remaining artefacts. The Trust may nominate Mungalalu Truscott Base for inclusion by the Australian Heritage Council in the Register of the National Estate in the future. The Trust has communicated that the classification has "no legal significance and does not infringe any rights of ownership" leaving administration to the joint understanding of the operator (MT Airbase) and the WGAC.

See also
 List of airports in Western Australia
 Aviation transport in Australia

References 

 Beasy, John and Carol (1995) Truscott : the diary of Australia's secret wartime Kimberley airbase Loftus, N.S.W: Australian Military History Publications.

External links
Peter Dunn, 2000, ozatwar.com, "Truscott Airfield on Anjo Peninsular in Western Australia during WW2" (includes maps)
More from ozatwar.com
 pacificwrecks.com "Truscott" (includes pictures)
Pacific Wrecks site on the "Dinah" Japanese wreck at Truscott
Detailed Information about B24 Liberator A72-80 crash

Truscott
Airports established in 1944
Kimberley airports